Jörg Ludewig (born 9 September 1975 in Halle, North Rhine-Westphalia) is a German former road cyclist. Ludewig turned professional in 1997, with the Gerolsteiner team. He became a typical "bottlebringer" and teamrider while doing several "grand tours", including 3 editions of the Tour de France.

In August 2006, Ludewig was suspended from the T-Mobile Team for some races due to doping discussions, and a letter where Ludewig informed himself regarding substances being used in the sports-world.

After being a Pro Rider, Ludewig became head of sales at lightweight.info while taking care of a hobbyteam of freetime-riders. He switched to the Dr. Wolff group in 2015 as a sports marketing manager. His daughter was born in January 2015.

Career achievements

Major results

1998
 3rd Rund um Düren
 10th Overall Tour de Serbie
1999
 7th Overall Tour de l'Avenir 
1st Stage 1
 2nd Overall Course de Solidarność et des Champions Olympiques
1st Stage 6
2000
 7th Rund um Düren
2001
 7th Overall Bayern Rundfahrt
1st Stage 1
 7th Overall Tour de Langkawi
2003
 5th Road race, National Road Championships
2004
 4th Overall Hessen Rundfahrt
2005
 3rd GP Triberg-Schwarzwald
 4th Sparkassen Giro Bochum
 9th Rund um die Hainleite
2007
 5th Road race, National Road Championships
 9th Overall Tour of Qinghai Lake
1st Stage 4

Grand Tour general classification results timeline

References

External links

1975 births
Living people
German male cyclists
Doping cases in cycling
People from Halle (Westfalen)
Sportspeople from Detmold (region)
Cyclists from North Rhine-Westphalia